Penllergaer is the name of an electoral ward (and a community) in the City and County of Swansea, Wales, UK.  Penllergaer has its own elected community council.

The electoral ward consists of Penllergaer, East and West, in the parliamentary constituency of Gower.  It is a mainly rural ward with grassland to the south and woodland to the north.  It is bordered by the wards of Llangyfelach to the northeast; Penderry to the south; Kingsbridge to the south west; Gorseinon to the west, Penyrheol to the north west.

In the 2008 local council elections, the turnout for Penllergaer was 45.56%.  The results were:

In the 2012 local council elections, the turnout for Penllergaer was 42.47%.  The results were:

References

External links
Penllergaer ward info

Swansea electoral wards